Bill Carpenter was an Australian rugby league footballer who played in the 1920s and 1930s.

Playing career
Carpenter made his debut for Western Suburbs in 1923 against Glebe at Pratten Park.  In 1929, Carpenter was a member of the Wests side which reached the preliminary final before losing to South Sydney.  In 1930, Carpenter played 14 games for Wests as the club won the minor premiership but were defeated in the grand final against St. George. Carpenter played two more seasons for Wests, and retired at the end of 1932.

References

Western Suburbs Magpies players
Australian rugby league players
Rugby league second-rows